Thomas Lucas (18 February 1852 – 13 March 1945) was an Australian cricketer. He played in one first-class match for South Australia in 1877/78.

See also
 List of South Australian representative cricketers

References

External links
 

1852 births
1945 deaths
Australian cricketers
South Australia cricketers
Cricketers from Adelaide